The 2017–18 Miami Hurricanes men's basketball team represented the University of Miami during the 2017–18 NCAA Division I men's basketball season. Led by seventh-year head coach Jim Larrañaga, they played their home games at the Watsco Center on the university's campus in Coral Gables, Florida as members of the Atlantic Coast Conference (ACC). They finished the season 22–10, 11–7 in ACC play to finish in a four-way tie for third place. They lost in the quarterfinals of the ACC tournament to North Carolina. They received an at-large bid to the NCAA tournament where they lost in the first round to Loyola–Chicago.

Previous season
The Hurricanes finished the 2016–17 season 21–12, 10–8 in ACC play to finish in a three-way tie for seventh place. They defeated Syracuse in the second round of the ACC tournament to advance to the quarterfinals where they lost to North Carolina. They received an at-large bid to the NCAA tournament as the #8 seed in the Midwest region where they lost in the first round to #9 Michigan State.

FBI investigation 

On September 26, 2017 federal prosecutors in New York announced that various schools were under investigation for an alleged "pay for play" scheme involving recruits at various schools including Miami. On October 23, head coach Jim Larrañaga announced that he believed he was one of the coaches implicated in the FBI indictment. Larrañaga insisted that he had done nothing wrong, however.

Offseason

Departures

Incoming transfers

2017 recruiting class

Roster

Schedule and results

|-
!colspan=12 style=| Exhibition

|-
!colspan=12 style=| Non-conference Regular Season

|-
!colspan=12 style=| ACC Regular Season

|-
!colspan=12 style=| ACC tournament

|-
!colspan=12 style=| NCAA tournament

Rankings

^Coaches did not release a Week 2 poll.
*AP does not release post-NCAA tournament rankings

References

Miami Hurricanes men's basketball seasons
Miami
Miami
Miami Hurricanes men's basketball team
Miami Hurricanes men's basketball team